Arns is a surname. Notable people with the surname include:

Inke Arns (born 1968), German curator and writer
Paulo Evaristo Arns (1921–2016), Brazilian Roman Catholic archbishop and cardinal
Robert Arns (1933–2019), American physicist and historian
Zilda Arns (1934–2010), Brazilian pediatrician and aid worker